Gorno Krušje, or simply Krušje, is a village in northern Resen Municipality, North Macedonia, located roughly  from the municipal centre of Resen. The village has 107 residents as of the most recent census in 2002.

Demographics 
Gorno Krušje has been exclusively inhabited by ethnic Macedonians.

References 

Villages in Resen Municipality